General elections were held in Ecuador on 2 June 1968. The presidential election was won by José María Velasco Ibarra of the National Velasquista Federation, who received 32.8% of the vote. He started his fifth and last term in office on 1 September.

President

References

Elections in Ecuador
1968 in Ecuador
Ecuador
Election and referendum articles with incomplete results